Blepharophimosis, ptosis, epicanthus inversus syndrome (BPES) is a rare disease characterized by the conditions it is named after: blepharophimosis, ptosis and epicanthus inversus. There are two types; type 1 is distinguished from type 2 by including the symptom of premature ovarian insufficiency (POI) in females, which causes menopausal symptoms and infertility in patients as young as 15 years old.

Signs and symptoms 
The most prominent symptoms of BPES are horizontally narrow eyes (blepharophimosis), drooping eyelids (ptosis) and a fold of skin running from the side of the nose to the lower eyelid (epicanthus inversus). Other common symptoms include lack of an eyelid fold, an appearance of widely spaced eyes (telecanthus), low nose bridge and ear malformations (including cupping and incomplete development). Rare symptoms include microphthalmos (abnormally small eyes), tear ducts in the wrong location and a high-arched palate. Type 1 BPES is distinguished by including premature ovarian insufficiency (POI) in females, which causes menopausal symptoms and infertility in patients as young as 15 years old.

Genetics 

BPES is caused by a mutation in the gene FOXL2, located at 3q23 (band 23 on the long arm of chromosome 3). There are two types, caused by different mutations in this gene, but both follow an autosomal dominant pattern of inheritance.

Diagnosis 
Though BPES can be suggested by the presence of blepharophimosis, ptosis and/or epicanthus inversus, it can only be definitively diagnosed by genetic testing. Other disorders that appear similar include Waardenburg syndrome and Ohdo blepharophimosis syndrome.

Treatment 
The main treatment is symptomatic, since the underlying genetic defect cannot be corrected as of 2015. Symptomatic treatment is surgical.

Epidemiology 
BPES is very rare: only 50–100 cases have been described. It affects slightly more males than females.

References

External links 

Rare syndromes
Syndromes affecting the eye